Paul Thomas Hanlon (born 20 January 1990) is a Scottish professional footballer who plays as a defender for Scottish Premiership club Hibernian, where he is the current club captain, and the Scotland national team. He began his senior career with Hibernian, making his debut in 2008, and has gone to make over 500 appearances for the club. He also briefly played for St Johnstone on loan during the 2008–09 season.

Hanlon represented Scotland at the under-19 and under-21 levels, and made his full international debut in October 2020.

Club career
Hanlon played for the well known Edinburgh youth football club Hutchison Vale, along with future Hibs teammate Danny Galbraith. Hanlon was an attacking midfielder who scored plenty of goals in youth football, but was converted to a defensive position after he signed for boyhood club Hibs. He played his first senior game for Hibs on 12 January 2008, against Inverness Caledonian Thistle in the Scottish Cup, due to injuries sustained by David Murphy and Lewis Stevenson. Hanlon played for Hibs on a regular basis over the next seven months, and he agreed a five-year contract with the club.

During the 2008–09 season, however, Hanlon was replaced by Ian Murray as Hibs' regular left back. Hanlon was loaned out to St Johnstone in December 2008, initially for one month. St Johnstone wanted to extend the loan arrangement, but Hibs refused to allow this. Hanlon went straight back into the Hibs team after returning from St Johnstone, but he was dropped soon afterwards by Mixu Paatelainen due to a defensive error he made in a match against Kilmarnock.

Hanlon played infrequently during the 2009–10 season, only featuring when one of the regular defenders was unavailable. One such period was when Sol Bamba was with the Ivory Coast national team at the 2010 Africa Cup of Nations; manager John Hughes said it was a tough decision to reinstate Bamba to the team at Hanlon's expense. At the end of the season, Hughes commented that Hanlon was a "great" footballer, but needed to become tougher and show more desire.

Hughes again praised Hanlon before the start of the 2010–11 season, saying that he had a "real future" in the game and had the potential to play in the Premier League. Following the departure of Chris Hogg, Hanlon captained the team at times. Hanlon agreed a new contract with the club in May 2011.

Hibs struggled in the 2011–12 season, only securing a place in the SPL with a 4–0 win against Dunfermline in early May. Hanlon scored the fourth goal, which was awarded despite the fact the ball had not crossed the goal-line. He played in Scottish Cup final defeats in 2012 and 2013.

He won the club's player of the year award for the 2013–14 season, awarded in March 2014. At the same time, Hanlon was ruled out of action for the rest of the season due to a knee injury. Hibs were seven points ahead of the relegation play-off position at that point, but a continued bad run of results led to their eventual relegation to the Scottish Championship.

In the 2015–16 season, Hanlon scored the winning goal in a match against Rangers and scored an injury-time equaliser away to Hearts in the 2015–16 Scottish Cup. Hibs won the replay against Hearts at Easter Road and went on to win the competition, defeating Rangers 3–2 in the final.

Hanlon signed a three-year contract with Hibs in June 2016. He missed much of the second half of the 2016–17 season due to a pelvic injury, but the team earned promotion to the Premiership. He was awarded a testimonial by Hibs in March 2018, and soon afterwards agreed a new contract with the club.

Hanlon made his 400th competitive appearance for Hibs on 23 November 2019, in a 3–1 win against Motherwell.

Following the retirement of David Gray, Hanlon was appointed club captain in July 2021. On 16 November 2021, Hanlon signed a new long-term contract with Hibernian, keeping him at the club until 2024. Hanlon made his 500th appearance for the club on 7 May 2022, in a 1–1 draw against Aberdeen.

International career

Hanlon captained Scotland under-19, and made his debut for Scotland under-21 in a 1–0 win against Albania in March 2009. Hanlon was a regular in central defence during the 2011 UEFA European Under-21 Championship qualification campaign, which ended in a play-off defeat by Iceland. Hanlon then captained an inexperienced side in November 2010 as head coach Billy Stark made initial preparations for the 2013 UEFA European Under-21 Championship qualification campaign. He scored the second goal in a 3–1 win for Scotland in a friendly match against Northern Ireland.

Hanlon received his first call-up to the senior Scotland squad in November 2017, for a friendly match with the Netherlands. He was recalled to the squad in October 2020, and made his full international debut in a 1–0 win against the Czech Republic.

Career statistics

Honours
Hibernian
Scottish Cup: 2015–16
Scottish Championship: 2016–17

Notes

References

1990 births
Living people
Footballers from Edinburgh
Scottish footballers
Scotland youth international footballers
Scotland under-21 international footballers
Scotland international footballers
Association football defenders
Lothian Thistle Hutchison Vale F.C. players
Hibernian F.C. players
St Johnstone F.C. players
Scottish Premier League players
Scottish Football League players
Scottish Professional Football League players
People educated at Tynecastle High School